IDRF may refer to:
 International Development and Relief Foundation, Canadian charity for raising funds for Muslim causes around the world
 International Diving Regulators Forum
 India Development and Relief Fund, American charity that supports development projects in India